The Twin River Collegiate Conference was a short-lived intercollegiate athletic conference that existed from 1976 to 1978. The league had members in the state of Minnesota.

Football champions

1976 – Concordia–St. Paul
1977 – Concordia–St. Paul and Martin Luther (MN)
1978 – Concordia–St. Paul and Northwestern (MN)

See also
List of defunct college football conferences

References

Defunct college sports conferences in the United States
College sports in Minnesota